Daikirin Takayoshi (大麒麟 將能) (20 June 1942 – 4 August 2010), born Masakatsu Tsutsumi, was a sumo wrestler from Saga Prefecture, Japan. He began his professional career in 1958 and reached his highest rank of ōzeki twelve years later in 1970. He retired in 1974, and until June 2006 he was an elder of the Sumo Association under the name Oshiogawa.

Career
Born in Morodome in the city of Saga, he joined Nishonoseki stable and made his professional debut in May 1958. He initially fought under his own surname of Tsutsumi. After four years in the lower ranks he reached sekitori status in May 1962 upon promotion to the jūryō division, and changed his shikona to Kirinji. He did not make an immediate impact but in May 1963 took the jūryō yūshō or championship with a 13–2 score which pushed him up to jūryō 1. A 10–5 record in the next tournament saw him enter the top makuuchi division for the first time but he had to pull out halfway into his debut tournament and returned to the second division.

After suffering some more injury problems he finally won promotion back to makuuchi in July 1965. He slowly climbed up the maegashira ranks before earning three kinboshi in successive tournaments from May to September 1966, defeating yokozuna Kashiwado twice, and then Sadanoyama. (He did not have to face the most successful yokozuna, Taihō, because they were members of the same stable). His 11–4 score in the September tournament saw him promoted to sekiwake. He remained in the san'yaku ranks for the next seven tournaments, earning several awards, before dropping back briefly to the maegashira ranks. In March 1968 at komusubi rank he defeated Sadanoyama, the winner of the previous two tournaments, in what was to be the yokozuna'''s last ever bout. Kirinji went on to finish runner-up, his final day defeat handing the yūshō to maegashira Wakanami, who did not face any yokozuna or ōzeki during the tournament.

Kirinji remained comfortably within the san'yaku ranks for the next two years, but with mainly 8–7 and 9–6 scores he was not a candidate for ōzeki promotion. He was runner-up for the second time (to Kitanofuji) in November 1969, and in the July and September tournaments of 1970 he finally managed to put together two strong performances in a row, scoring 12–3 each time, and was promoted to ōzeki at the age of 28. To mark the occasion he adopted a new shikona, Daikirin.

Daikirin remained as an ōzeki for 25 tournaments over four years. He was unable to win a championship, although he was a runner-up twice more, to Tamanoumi in July 1971 and Wajima in May 1972. However he was also kadoban (in danger of relegation) a number of times. In November 1974, having barely maintained his rank with an 8–7 record in the previous tournament, he retired from sumo on the fourth day at the age of 32.

Retirement from sumo
He remained in the sumo world as an elder under the name Oshiogawa. In 1975, upon the death of his old stablemaster (former ōzeki Sagonohana), he expected to inherit Nishonoseki stable, but could not come to agreement with Saganohana's widow.  After former sekiwake Kongō's engagement to Saganohana's daughter was announced, Oshiogawa realised he now had no chance of taking over so instead he broke away and established his own Oshiogawa stable. He attempted to take a number of high-ranking wrestlers with him, such as Aobajō and Tenryū, but Nishonoseki stable objected to this. The Japan Sumo Association intervened and Tenryū was forced to return to Nishonoseki and, disillusioned, quit to become a professional wrestler. Meanwhile, in addition to Aobajō, Oshiogawa produced a number of other sekitori'' such as Masurao, Enazakura, Daishi, Wakatoba and Wakakirin. In March 2005, with Oshiogawa approaching the mandatory retirement age and  no obvious successor available, his stable was absorbed into the affiliated Oguruma stable. Oshiogawa retired from his position in the Sumo Association a year before reaching the mandatory retirement age, in June 2006.

He died of pancreatic cancer in August 2010 at the age of 68.

Career record

See also
Glossary of sumo terms
List of sumo tournament top division runners-up
List of sumo tournament second division champions
List of past sumo wrestlers
List of ōzeki

References

1942 births
2010 deaths
Deaths from cancer in Japan
Deaths from pancreatic cancer
Japanese sumo wrestlers
Ōzeki
People from Saga (city)
Sumo people from Saga Prefecture